Michelangelo is a 2000 children's biography by Diane Stanley. It covers Michelangelo's life, from his childhood to his death.

Reception
Reviews of Michelangelo include by Booklist that wrote "One of the most pleasing things about Stanley's books is the way her sturdy texts stand up to her strong artwork. That's particularly evident here .." and the School Library Journal that stated "she (Stanley) has crafted a picture-book biography that is as readable as it is useful."  Kirkus Reviews in a star review wrote "she weaves all the major elements of Michelangelo’s long and astonishingly creative life into a compelling, anecdote-rich narrative .. This handsome, affordable, lavishly illustrated and wonderfully readable book has broad appeal." and Publishers Weekly called it a "panoramic telling of his life story", concluding "The dislocating effect (Stanley's use of digital art composition) blemishes an otherwise outstanding work."

The Horn Book Magazine review included "Stanley has indeed captured in both words and pictures the essence of Michelangelo, man of the Renaissance-sculptor, painter, architect."

Awards and nominations
2001 Orbis Pictus Honor Book
2001 Notable Social Studies Trade Books For Young People

References

External links

Library holdings of Michelangelo

2000 children's books
American picture books
Michelangelo
Children's non-fiction books
Biographies about artists
Italian biographies
Cultural depictions of Michelangelo